Peter Trowbridge is an American landscape architect, Professor and former Chair of Landscape Architecture at Cornell University

Education 
He received an AS from Alfred State University, a BS/BLA degree from Syracuse University, Environmental Science and Forestry, and a Master's in Landscape Architecture from Harvard University Graduate School of Design

Career 
He worked for major landscape architecture firms as project manager, including Schumm and Werle, and Reimann/Buechner; he then became Principal of the firm, Trowbridge & Wolf Landscape Architects  in 1976.

Achievements 
He has been Editor of Landscape and Urban Planning Journal, and was a Contributing Editor of Landscape Architecture Magazine. He is the Chair of the Landscape Architecture Accreditation Board, Past President, New York Upstate Chapter of the American Society of Landscape Architects, and Fellow of the American Society of Landscape Architects

25 Most Admired Faculty (2016) Design Intelligence

25 Most Admired Educators (2013) Design Intelligence

Outstanding Administrator (2013) Council of Educators in Landscape Architecture

Publications

Books
Coauthor, Trees in the Urban Landscape with Nina Bassuk

References 

1. Biography
2. Department Website

American landscape architects
Cornell University faculty
Syracuse University alumni
Harvard Graduate School of Design alumni
Living people
Year of birth missing (living people)
Alfred State College alumni